Northern Senior High School was a public four-year high school located on the north end of Detroit, Michigan, United States. The school was a part of the Detroit Public Schools district. By the latter part of the 2000s, Northern Senior High School was cited for closure as well as several other local high schools in the Detroit School District.  The Detroit International Academy is now housed in the building that was formerly known as Northern Senior High School. When Northern existed, it served a portion of New Center. It was founded in 1916.

Notable alumni

 Bill Buntin – NBA basketball player (Detroit Pistons).
Alyce Chenault Gullattee (1946) – physician, psychiatrist, professor at Howard University College of Medicine
 Derrick Coleman (1986) – NBA basketball player (New Jersey Nets, Philadelphia 76ers).
 Marshall Dill (1971) – Track & field athlete.
 Aretha Franklin (attended) – Singer–songwriter, pianist ("Queen of Soul").
 Pete Moore (attended) – musician
 Harry Newman (1930) – All–Pro football quarterback (University of Michigan).
 Smokey Robinson (1957) – Singer–songwriter.
 Sam Williams (1964) – NBA basketball player (Milwaukee Bucks).

References

External links

Northern High School at Detroit Public Schools (Archive)

Former high schools in Michigan
High schools in Detroit
1916 establishments in Michigan
Detroit Public Schools Community District
Educational institutions established in 1916